The Jeffery–Williams Prize is a mathematics award presented annually by the Canadian Mathematical Society.  The award is presented to individuals in recognition of outstanding contributions to mathematical research. The first award was presented in 1968. The prize was named in honor of the mathematicians Ralph Lent Jeffery and Lloyd Williams.

Recipients of the Jeffery–Williams Prize
Source: Canadian Mathematical Society

See also

 List of mathematics awards

References

External links
 Canadian Mathematical Society

Awards of the Canadian Mathematical Society
Awards established in 1968
1968 establishments in Canada